Cosmo Clock 21 is a 112.5 metre tall ferris wheel at the Cosmo World amusement park in the Minato Mirai 21 district of Yokohama, Japan. When it first opened, it was the world's tallest Ferris wheel, until the completion of the  Igosu 108 in Shiga, Japan, in 1992.

History and specifications

Cosmo Clock 21 has 60 passenger cars, each capable of carrying up to eight people. One rotation of the  diameter wheel takes 15 minutes.

Coordinates
 1st (107.5 m tall) installation, completed 1989, dismantled 1997: ?
 2nd (112.5 m tall) installation, completed 1999:

Gallery

References

Ferris wheels in Japan
Buildings and structures in Yokohama
Tourist attractions in Yokohama
Amusement rides introduced in 1989
1989 establishments in Japan
Minato Mirai 21